Dmytro Mytsak (born November 8, 1995 in Boryslav, Ukraine) is an alpine skier from Ukraine. He competed for Ukraine at the 2014 Winter Olympics in the alpine skiing events.

References

1995 births
Living people
Olympic alpine skiers of Ukraine
Alpine skiers at the 2014 Winter Olympics
Ukrainian male alpine skiers
Alpine skiers at the 2012 Winter Youth Olympics